The Ministry of Sport of the Republic of Colombia (Mindeporte - MD) is the governmental entity of the Executive Branch in charge of formulating, coordinating and monitor the practice of sports, recreation, physical education, the use of free time and physical activity, aimed at improving the quality of life of Colombian society.

It is headquartered at Avenida 68 No. 55-65, in Bogotá. She is the current Minister of Sports, since August 7, 2022. María Isabel Urrutia.

Structure
The Ministry of Sport is made up of the Office of the Minister, the advisory offices, the General Secretariat and the Vice Ministry of Sport, as follows:

Office of the Minister of Sport
Planning Advisory Office
Legal Advisory Office
Internal Control Office
Advisory Office of Internal Disciplinary Control
General Secretary
Office of the Vice Minister of Sport
Direction of Positioning and Sports Leadership
Inspection, Surveillance and Control Directorate
Department of Promotion and Development
Directorate of Resources and Tools of the National Sports System

See also 
 Coldeportes
 Colombian Olympic Committee
 Colombian Paralympic Committee

References

External links 
 

Government agencies of Colombia
Organisations based in Bogotá
Sports ministries
Sport in Colombia